Florence Norene Arnold [Witzel] (November 21, 1927 – January 27, 1987) was a right-handed pitcher and utility infielder who played in the All-American Girls Professional Baseball League in its 1949 season. She was dubbed 'Blondie'.

Born in Oregon, Illinois, Norene Arnold spent a season in the league with the Springfield Sallies travelling team and the Muskegon Lassies. No statistics were kept by the Sallies in 1949 and she likely played less than 10 games with the Lassies.

Facts
It was a neglected chapter of sports history, at least until , when was inaugurated a permanent display at the Baseball Hall of Fame and Museum at Cooperstown, New York, which is dedicated to the entire league rather than any individual figure.

After that, filmmaker Penny Marshall premiered her 1992 film A League of Their Own, a fictional history centered in the first season of the AAGPBL. Starring Geena Davis, Tom Hanks, Madonna, Lori Petty and Rosie O'Donnell, this film brought a rejuvenated interest to the extinct league.

References

External links 
 

1927 births
1987 deaths
All-American Girls Professional Baseball League players
Muskegon Lassies players
Springfield Sallies players
Baseball players from Illinois
People from Ogle County, Illinois
Baseball pitchers
20th-century American women